The 2010–11 Pittsburgh Penguins season was the team's 44th season in the National Hockey League (NHL). The Penguins began the season in their new arena, CONSOL Energy Center, which is adjacent from their old facility, Mellon Arena, which had been the third smallest and oldest arena in the NHL. The Penguins also hosted the 2011 NHL Winter Classic against the Washington Capitals at Heinz Field, home of the National Football League's Pittsburgh Steelers and NCAA's's Pittsburgh Panthers football.

Pre-season
On June 16, the Pittsburgh Penguins announced that they would play a six-game pre-season, including the first-ever game at the new Consol Energy Center on September 22 against the Detroit Red Wings.

On July 26, 2010, longtime Penguins PA announcer John Barbero died of brain cancer at age 65.

Game log

|-  style="text-align:center; background:#cfc;"
| 1 || September 22 || Detroit Red Wings || 1–5 || Pittsburgh Penguins || || Fleury || 18,087 || 1–0–0 || Recap
|-  style="text-align:center; background:#cfc;"
| 2 || September 24 || Pittsburgh Penguins ||5–4 || Columbus Blue Jackets || || Curry || 10,694 || 2–0–0 || Recap
|-  style="text-align:center; background:#cfc;"
| 3 || September 25 || Columbus Blue Jackets || 1–3 || Pittsburgh Penguins || || Fleury || 18,087 || 3–0–0 || Recap
|- style="text-align:center; background:#cfc;"
| 4 || September 28 || Chicago Blackhawks || 1–4 || Pittsburgh Penguins || || Johnson || 18,087 || 4–0–0 || Recap
|- style="text-align:center; background:#fcf;"
| 5 || October 1 || Pittsburgh Penguins || 2–5 || Chicago Blackhawks || || Johnson || 19,913 || 4–1–0
|| Recap
|- style="text-align:center; background:#cfc;"
| 6 || October 3 || Pittsburgh Penguins || 5–2 || Detroit Red Wings || || Fleury || 17,501 || 5–1–0
|| Recap
|-

|- style="text-align:center;"
| Legend:       = Win       = Loss       = OT/SO Loss

Regular season

First half
The Penguins inaugurated their new arena on October 7 with a home opener against their in-state rivals, the Philadelphia Flyers, the defending Eastern Conference champions, whom they will play three times in the first month of the season. However, rookie Flyers goaltender Sergei Bobrovsky made his NHL debut, leading his team to a 3–2 victory. Flyers forward Daniel Briere scored the first goal in the new building. In the first month of the season, goaltender Marc-Andre Fleury struggled, posting a 1–5 record for the month while backup goaltender Brent Johnson was 5–0–1 and posting a shutout in the final game of the month against the Carolina Hurricanes. Injuries were another trend for the first month of the season, with Jordan Staal failing to play the first month of the season with an infection in his foot. Other injuries to Zbynek Michalek and Brooks Orpik weakened the defensive unit during the first month. During the month of November, the Penguins went on a 12-game winning streak beginning with a 3-1 victory against the Vancouver Canucks on November 17.  At the same time team captain Sidney Crosby went on a 25-game point streak during which he recorded 26 goals and 24 assists.  The Penguins winning streak ended on December 14 with 3-2 loss in Philadelphia.

After 41 games, the midpoint of the season, the Penguins held a 26–12–3 record with 55 points, a two-point improvement over last season and good for second in the division behind the Philadelphia Flyers and fourth in the Eastern Conference.

2011 Winter Classic 

The Penguins held the 2011 NHL Winter Classic at Heinz Field on January 1 against the Washington Capitals. This matchup pitted the two premiere stars of the game against each other, Sidney Crosby and Alexander Ovechkin. The Capitals won the contest however 3–1, overcoming a 1–0 Penguins lead in which Evgeni Malkin scored the lone Penguins goal. Jordan Staal made a return to the Penguins lineup in the Winter Classic after being held out all of the 2010 contests of the season due to foot and hand injuries.

Crosby suffered a concussion in an open ice hit in the Winter Classic but remained in the game and took part in the following contest with the Tampa Bay Lightning. Against Tampa Bay, however, he was hit again, this time behind the net against the boards and further aggravated his concussion. Crosby was held out games from January 7 through the end of the regular season.

Second half
Defenseman Kris Letang had a breakout first half of the season, sitting second on the team in points scored behind center Sidney Crosby. Letang, Crosby, Evgeni Malkin and goaltender Marc-Andre Fleury were named to the roster of the 2011 NHL All-Star Game, though only Letang and Fleury made appearances, as Crosby and Malkin were held out of the contest with head and lower body injures, respectively.

Malkin also missed multiple games in late January due to a lingering lower body injury and a sinus infection. He returned to the lineup against the Buffalo Sabres on February 4, but reactivated the injury during a hit by Tyler Myers in the second period, tearing his right medial collateral ligament (MCL) and anterior cruciate ligament (ACL).

Crosby and Malkin were injured for most of January and into February. In spite of these injuries, the Penguins still held onto second place in the Division and fourth place in the Conference for most of the first half and middle of the season, going 8–3–1 without Crosby, which includes 4–1–0 without both Crosby and Malkin during the same 8–3–1 span.

Due to the absence of Malkin and Crosby, the Penguin's offense was not nearly as productive. This led general manager Ray Shero to make personnel adjustments before the February trade deadline. On February 21, the Penguins traded defenseman Alex Goligoski to the Dallas Stars for left winger James Neal and defenseman Matt Niskanen. The organization also acquired right winger Alex Kovalev from the Ottawa Senators for a conditional draft pick on February 24.

On March 25, the Penguins defeated the New Jersey Devils 1–0 in a shootout. James Neal scored the lone goal, marking the fourth year in a row the Penguins have won a game on March 25 in a shutout and the first to go to overtime or a shootout.

On March 28, the Penguins set an NHL record by winning their fourth consecutive game in a shootout. During the stretch, the team defeated the Detroit Red Wings, Philadelphia Flyers, New Jersey Devils and Florida Panthers in a seven-day period.

The Penguins concluded the regular season with the best penalty-kill percentage in the NHL, at 86.11%

Game log

|- style="background:#fcf;"
| 1 || 7 || 7:00 pm || Philadelphia Flyers || 3–2 || Pittsburgh Penguins || Consol Energy Center (18,289) || 0–1–0 || 0
|- style="background:#fcf;"
| 2 || 9 || 7:00 pm || Montreal Canadiens || 3–2 || Pittsburgh Penguins || Consol Energy Center (18,106) || 0–2–0 || 0
|- style="background:#cfc;"
| 3 || 11 || 4:00 pm || Pittsburgh Penguins || 3–1 || New Jersey Devils || Prudential Center (12,880) || 1–2–0 || 2
|- style="background:#fcf;"
| 4 || 13 || 7:30 pm || Toronto Maple Leafs || 4–3 || Pittsburgh Penguins || Consol Energy Center (18,112) || 1–3–0 || 2
|- style="background:#cfc;"
| 5 || 15 || 7:00 pm || New York Islanders || 2–3 OT || Pittsburgh Penguins || Consol Energy Center (18,195) || 2–3–0 || 4
|- style="background:#cfc;"
| 6 || 16 || 6:00 pm || Pittsburgh Penguins || 5–1 || Philadelphia Flyers || Wells Fargo Center (19,684) || 3–3–0 || 6
|- style="background:#cfc;"
| 7 || 18 || 7:00 pm || Ottawa Senators || 2–5 || Pittsburgh Penguins || Consol Energy Center (18,101) || 4–3–0 || 8
|- style="background:#cfc;"
| 8 || 21 || 8:00 pm || Pittsburgh Penguins || 4–3 OT || Nashville Predators || Bridgestone Arena (17,113) || 5–3–0 || 10
|- style="background:#ffc;"
| 9 || 23 || 8:00 pm || Pittsburgh Penguins || 0–1 OT || St. Louis Blues || Scottrade Center (19,150) || 5–3–1 || 11
|- style="background:#fcf;"
| 10 || 27 || 7:30 pm || Pittsburgh Penguins || 3–5 || Tampa Bay Lightning || Amalie Arena (17,226) || 5–4–1 || 11
|- style="background:#fcf;"
| 11 || 29 || 7:00 pm || Philadelphia Flyers || 3–2 || Pittsburgh Penguins || Consol Energy Center (18,275) || 5–5–1 || 11
|- style="background:#cfc;"
| 12 || 30 || 7:00 pm || Pittsburgh Penguins || 3–0 || Carolina Hurricanes || PNC Arena (18,680) || 6–5–1 || 13
|-

|- style="background:#fcf;"
| 13 || 3 || 8:30 pm || Pittsburgh Penguins || 2–5 || Dallas Stars || American Airlines Center (15,637) || 6–6–1 || 13
|- style="background:#fcf;"
| 14 || 5 || 10:00 pm || Pittsburgh Penguins || 2–3 || Anaheim Ducks || Honda Center (17,174) || 6–7–1 || 13
|- style="background:#cfc;"
| 15 || 6 || 9:00 pm || Pittsburgh Penguins || 4–3 SO || Phoenix Coyotes || Gila River Arena (14,642) || 7–7–1 || 15
|- style="background:#fcf;"
| 16 || 10 || 7:00 pm || Boston Bruins || 7–4 || Pittsburgh Penguins || Consol Energy Center (18,113) || 7–8–1 || 15
|- style="background:#cfc;"
| 17 || 12 || 7:00 pm || Tampa Bay Lightning || 1–5 || Pittsburgh Penguins || Consol Energy Center (18,275) || 8–8–1 || 17
|- style="background:#cfc;"
| 18 || 13 || 7:00 pm || Pittsburgh Penguins || 4–2 || Atlanta Thrashers || Philips Arena (16,710) || 9–8–1 || 19
|- style="background:#ffc;"
| 19 || 15 || 7:00 pm || New York Rangers || 3–2 OT || Pittsburgh Penguins || Consol Energy Center (18,125) || 9–8–2 || 20
|- style="background:#cfc;"
| 20 || 17 || 7:00 pm || Vancouver Canucks || 1–3 || Pittsburgh Penguins || Consol Energy Center (18,252) || 10–8–2 || 22
|- style="background:#cfc;"
| 21 || 19 || 7:00 pm || Carolina Hurricanes || 4–5 SO || Pittsburgh Penguins || Consol Energy Center (18,264) || 11–8–2 || 24
|- style="background:#cfc;"
| 22 || 22 || 7:30 pm || Pittsburgh Penguins || 3–2 || Florida Panthers || BB&T Center (16,543) || 12–8–2 || 26
|- style="background:#cfc;"
| 23 || 24 || 7:00 pm || Pittsburgh Penguins || 1–0 || Buffalo Sabres || First Niagara Center (18,250) || 13–8–2 || 28
|- style="background:#cfc;"
| 24 || 26 || 1:00 pm || Ottawa Senators || 1–2 || Pittsburgh Penguins || Consol Energy Center (18,299) || 14–8–2 || 30
|- style="background:#cfc;"
| 25 || 27 || 1:00 pm || Calgary Flames || 1–4 || Pittsburgh Penguins || Consol Energy Center (18,317) || 15–8–2 || 32
|- style="background:#cfc;"
| 26 || 29 || 7:00 pm || Pittsburgh Penguins || 3–1 || New York Rangers || Madison Square Garden (IV) (18,200) || 16–8–2 || 34
|-

|- style="background:#cfc;"
| 27 || 2 || 7:00 pm || Atlanta Thrashers || 2–3 || Pittsburgh Penguins || Consol Energy Center (18,223) || 17–8–2 || 36
|- style="background:#cfc;"
| 28 || 4 || 7:00 pm || Pittsburgh Penguins || 7–2 || Columbus Blue Jackets || Nationwide Arena (19,143) || 18–8–2 || 38
|- style="background:#cfc;"
| 29 || 6 || 7:00 pm || New Jersey Devils || 1–2 || Pittsburgh Penguins || Consol Energy Center (18,185) || 19–8–2 || 40
|- style="background:#cfc;"
| 30 || 8 || 7:00 pm || Toronto Maple Leafs || 2–5 || Pittsburgh Penguins || Consol Energy Center (18,158) || 20–8–2 || 42
|- style="background:#cfc;"
| 31 || 11 || 7:00 pm || Pittsburgh Penguins || 5–2 || Buffalo Sabres || First Niagara Center (18,690) || 21–8–2 || 44
|- style="background:#fcf;"
| 32 || 14 || 7:00 pm || Pittsburgh Penguins || 2–3 || Philadelphia Flyers || Wells Fargo Center (19,824) || 21–9–2 || 44
|- style="background:#fcf;"
| 33 || 15 || 7:00 pm || New York Rangers || 4–1 || Pittsburgh Penguins || Consol Energy Center (18,242) || 21–10–2 || 44
|- style="background:#cfc;"
| 34 || 20 || 7:00 pm || Phoenix Coyotes || 1–6 || Pittsburgh Penguins || Consol Energy Center (18,262) || 22–10–2 || 46
|- style="background:#cfc;"
| 35 || 22 || 7:00 pm || Florida Panthers || 2–5 || Pittsburgh Penguins || Consol Energy Center (18,238) || 23–10–2 || 48
|- style="background:#cfc;"
| 36 || 23 || 7:00 pm || Pittsburgh Penguins || 3–2 SO || Washington Capitals || Verizon Center (18,398) || 24–10–2 || 50
|- style="background:#fcf;"
| 37 || 26 || 7:30 pm || Pittsburgh Penguins || 1–3 || Ottawa Senators || Canadian Tire Centre (20,146) || 24–11–2 || 50
|- style="background:#cfc;"
| 38 || 28 || 7:00 pm || Atlanta Thrashers || 3–6 || Pittsburgh Penguins || Consol Energy Center (18,322) || 25–11–2 || 52
|- style="background:#ffc;"
| 39 || 29 || 7:00 pm || Pittsburgh Penguins || 1–2 SO || New York Islanders || Nassau Veterans Memorial Coliseum (14,345) || 25–11–3 || 53
|-

|- style="background:#fcf;"
| 40 || 1 || 8:00 pm || Washington Capitals || 3–1 || Pittsburgh Penguins || Acrisure Stadium (68,111) || 25–12–3 || 53
|- style="background:#cfc;"
| 41 || 5 || 7:00 pm || Tampa Bay Lightning || 1–8 || Pittsburgh Penguins || Consol Energy Center (18,261) || 26–12–3 || 55
|- style="background:#ffc;"
| 42 || 6 || 7:30 pm || Pittsburgh Penguins || 1–2 SO || Montreal Canadiens || Bell Centre (21,273) || 26–12–4 || 56
|- style="background:#fcf;"
| 43 || 8 || 7:00 pm || Minnesota Wild || 4–0 || Pittsburgh Penguins || Consol Energy Center (18,263) || 26–13–4 || 56
|- style="background:#fcf;"
| 44 || 10 || 7:30 pm || Boston Bruins || 4–2 || Pittsburgh Penguins || Consol Energy Center (18,245) || 26–14–4 || 56
|- style="background:#cfc;"
| 45 || 12 || 7:30 pm || Pittsburgh Penguins || 5–2 || Montreal Canadiens || Bell Centre (21,273) || 27–14–4 || 58
|- style="background:#cfc;"
| 46 || 15 || 1:00 pm || Pittsburgh Penguins || 3–2 || Boston Bruins || TD Garden (17,565) || 28–14–4 || 60
|- style="background:#cfc;"
| 47 || 18 || 7:00 pm || Detroit Red Wings || 1–4 || Pittsburgh Penguins || Consol Energy Center (18,284) || 29–14–4 || 62
|- style="background:#fcf;"
| 48 || 20 || 7:00 pm || Pittsburgh Penguins || 0–2 || New Jersey Devils || Prudential Center (14,890) || 29–15–4 || 62
|- style="background:#cfc;"
| 49 || 22 || 7:00 pm || Carolina Hurricanes || 2–3 || Pittsburgh Penguins || Consol Energy Center (18,305) || 30–15–4 || 64
|- style="background:#cfc;"
| 50 || 25 || 7:00 pm || New York Islanders || 0–1 || Pittsburgh Penguins || Consol Energy Center (18,225) || 31–15–4 || 66
|-

|- style="background:#cfc;"
| 51 || 1 || 7:30 pm || Pittsburgh Penguins || 4–3 SO || New York Rangers || Madison Square Garden (IV) (18,200) || 32–15–4 || 68
|- style="background:#cfc;"
| 52 || 2 || 7:00 pm || New York Islanders || 0–3 || Pittsburgh Penguins || Consol Energy Center (18,142) || 33–15–4 || 70
|- style="background:#cfc;"
| 53 || 4 || 7:00 pm || Buffalo Sabres || 2–3 || Pittsburgh Penguins || Consol Energy Center (18,315) || 34–15–4 || 72
|- style="background:#fcf;"
| 54 || 6 || 12:30 pm || Pittsburgh Penguins || 0–3 || Washington Capitals || Verizon Center (18,398) || 34–16–4 || 72
|- style="background:#fcf;"
| 55 || 8 || 7:00 pm || Columbus Blue Jackets || 4–1 || Pittsburgh Penguins || Consol Energy Center (18,147) || 34–17–4 || 72
|- style="background:#cfc;"
| 56 || 10 || 7:00 pm || Los Angeles Kings || 1–2 OT || Pittsburgh Penguins || Consol Energy Center (18,208) || 35–17–4 || 74
|- style="background:#fcf;"
| 57 || 11 || 7:00 pm || Pittsburgh Penguins || 3–9 || New York Islanders || Nassau Veterans Memorial Coliseum (12,888) || 35–18–4 || 74
|- style="background:#fcf;"
| 58 || 13 || 3:00 pm || Pittsburgh Penguins || 3–5 || New York Rangers || Madison Square Garden (IV) (18,200) || 35–19–4 || 74
|- style="background:#cfc;"
| 59 || 16 || 9:00 pm || Pittsburgh Penguins || 3–2 OT || Colorado Avalanche || Pepsi Center (17,357) || 36–19–4 || 76
|- style="background:#ffc;"
| 60 || 20 || 3:30 pm || Pittsburgh Penguins || 2–3 SO || Chicago Blackhawks || United Center (22,195) || 36–19–5 || 77
|- style="background:#fcf;"
| 61 || 21 || 7:30 pm || Washington Capitals || 1–0 || Pittsburgh Penguins || Consol Energy Center (18,263) || 36–20–5 || 77
|- style="background:#ffc;"
| 62 || 23 || 7:30 pm || San Jose Sharks || 3–2 OT || Pittsburgh Penguins || Consol Energy Center (18,253) || 36–20–6 || 78
|- style="background:#fcf;"
| 63 || 25 || 7:00 pm || Pittsburgh Penguins || 1–4 || Carolina Hurricanes || PNC Arena (18,719) || 36–21–6 || 78
|- style="background:#cfc;"
| 64 || 26 || 7:00 pm || Pittsburgh Penguins || 6–5 SO || Toronto Maple Leafs || Air Canada Centre (19,551) || 37–21–6 || 80
|-

|- style="background:#ffc;"
| 65 || 2 || 7:00 pm || Pittsburgh Penguins || 2–3 OT || Toronto Maple Leafs || Air Canada Centre (19,473) || 37–21–7 || 81
|- style="background:#ffc;"
| 66 || 4 || 7:00 pm || Pittsburgh Penguins || 1–2 OT || New Jersey Devils || Prudential Center (17,625) || 37–21–8 || 82
|- style="background:#cfc;"
| 67 || 5 || 7:00 pm || Pittsburgh Penguins || 3–2 OT || Boston Bruins || TD Garden (17,565) || 38–21–8 || 84
|- style="background:#cfc;"
| 68 || 8 || 7:00 pm || Buffalo Sabres || 1–3 || Pittsburgh Penguins || Consol Energy Center (18,314) || 39–21–8 || 86
|- style="background:#fcf;"
| 69 || 12 || 2:00 pm || Montreal Canadiens || 3–0 || Pittsburgh Penguins || Consol Energy Center (18,310) || 39–22–8 || 86
|- style="background:#cfc;"
| 70 || 13 || 3:00 pm || Edmonton Oilers || 1–5 || Pittsburgh Penguins || Consol Energy Center (18,197) || 40–22–8 || 88
|- style="background:#cfc;"
| 71 || 15 || 7:30 pm || Pittsburgh Penguins || 5–1 || Ottawa Senators || Canadian Tire Centre (19,249) || 41–22–8 || 90
|- style="background:#fcf;"
| 72 || 20 || 12:30 pm || New York Rangers || 5–2 || Pittsburgh Penguins || Consol Energy Center (18,278) || 41–23–8 || 90
|- style="background:#cfc;"
| 73 || 21 || 7:30 pm || Pittsburgh Penguins || 5–4 SO || Detroit Red Wings || Joe Louis Arena (20,066) || 42–23–8 || 92
|- style="background:#cfc;"
| 74 || 24 || 7:00 pm || Pittsburgh Penguins || 2–1 SO || Philadelphia Flyers || Wells Fargo Center (19,902) || 43–23–8 || 94
|- style="background:#cfc;"
| 75 || 25 || 7:00 pm || New Jersey Devils || 0–1 SO || Pittsburgh Penguins || Consol Energy Center (18,329) || 44–23–8 || 96
|- style="background:#cfc;"
| 76 || 27 || 1:00 pm || Florida Panthers || 1–2 SO || Pittsburgh Penguins || Consol Energy Center (18,270) || 45–23–8 || 98
|- style="background:#fcf;"
| 77 || 29 || 7:00 pm || Philadelphia Flyers || 5–2 || Pittsburgh Penguins || Consol Energy Center (18,335) || 45–24–8 || 98
|- style="background:#fcf;"
| 78 || 31 || 7:30 pm || Pittsburgh Penguins || 1–2 || Tampa Bay Lightning || Amalie Arena (20,126) || 45–25–8 || 98
|-

|- style="background:#cfc;"
| 79 || 2 || 7:00 pm || Pittsburgh Penguins || 4–2 || Florida Panthers || BB&T Center (18,178) || 46–25–8 || 100
|- style="background:#cfc;"
| 80 || 5 || 7:30 pm || New Jersey Devils || 2–4 || Pittsburgh Penguins || Consol Energy Center (18,331) || 47–25–8 || 102
|- style="background:#cfc;"
| 81 || 8 || 7:00 pm || Pittsburgh Penguins || 4–3 SO || New York Islanders || Nassau Veterans Memorial Coliseum (16,250) || 48–25–8 || 104
|- style="background:#cfc;"
| 82 || 10 || 3:00 pm || Pittsburgh Penguins || 5–2 || Atlanta Thrashers || Philips Arena (16,085) || 49–25–8 || 106
|-

|- style="text-align:center;"
| Legend:       = Win       = Loss       = OT/SO Loss

Standings

Detailed records 
Final

Playoffs

The Pittsburgh Penguins qualified for the Stanley Cup Playoffs for the fifth consecutive season. Their opponent in the first round were the Tampa Bay Lightning.

In Game 4 of the series on April 20, the Penguins defeated the Lightning on the road, 3–2 in double overtime. James Neal once again scored the winning goal. It marked the second time James Neal that Neal had scored the game-winning goal for the Penguins; the first time had been the shootout-winning goal on March 25 in a 1–0 victory over the New Jersey Devils.

On April 27, the Penguins were officially eliminated from the Stanley Cup Playoffs with a 1–0 loss to the Lightning in Game 7; it marked the second time in two years that the Penguins had lost a Game 7 on home ice and it was the first time that they had been eliminated in the first round of the playoffs since 2007. Furthermore, the Penguins were the third team to be knocked out of the playoffs in the debut of their new facility.

Game log

|-  style="text-align:center; background:#cfc;"
| 1 || April 13 || Tampa Bay || 0–3 || Pittsburgh || || Kovalev, Asham, Kunitz ||  || Fleury (1–0) || 18,390 || 1–0 ||
|-  style="text-align:center; background:#fcf;"
| 2 || April 15 || Tampa Bay || 5–1 || Pittsburgh || || Adams || Brewer, Lecavalier, Thompson, St. Louis, Ohlund || Fleury (1–1)  || 18,507 || 1–1 ||
|-  style="text-align:center; background:#cfc;"
| 3 || April 18 || Pittsburgh || 3–2 || Tampa Bay || || Talbot, Asham, Kennedy || St. Louis, St. Louis || Fleury (2–1) || 20,545 || 2–1 ||
|-  style="text-align:center; background:#cfc;"
| 4 || April 20 || Pittsburgh || 3–2 || Tampa Bay || 2OT || Kennedy, Asham, Neal || St. Louis, Bergenheim || Fleury (3–1) || 20,326 || 3–1 ||
|-  style="text-align:center; background:#fcf;"
| 5 || April 23 || Tampa Bay || 8–2 || Pittsburgh || || Rupp, Conner || Gagne, Stamkos, Lecavalier, Gagne, Stamkos, Kubina, Kubina, Moore || Fleury (3–2) || 18,535 || 3–2 ||
|-  style="text-align:center; background:#fcf;"
| 6 || April 25 || Pittsburgh || 2–4 || Tampa Bay || || Dupuis, Staal || Purcell, Bergenheim, Downie, Malone || Fleury (3–3) || 20,309 || 3–3 ||
|-  style="text-align:center; background:#fcf;"
| 7 || April 27 || Tampa Bay || 1–0 || Pittsburgh || ||  || Bergenheim || Fleury (3–4) || 18,507 || 3–4 ||
|-

|- style="text-align:center;"
| Legend:       = Win       = Loss       = OT/SO Loss

Scorer of game-winning goal in italics.

Player statistics
Skaters

Goaltenders

†Denotes player spent time with another team before joining Team.  Stats reflect time with the Team only.
‡Traded mid-season
Bold/italics denotes franchise record

Transactions
The Penguins have been involved in the following transactions during the 2010–11 season.

Trades

Free agents acquired

Free agents lost

Player signings

Notable achievements

Awards

Team awards

Milestones

Draft picks

Pittsburgh Penguins' picks at the 2010 NHL Entry Draft, held on June 25–26 at the Staples Center in Los Angeles.

Draft notes 
 The Pittsburgh Penguins' second-round pick went to the Florida Panthers as the result of a March 1, 2010, trade that sent Jordan Leopold to the Penguins in exchange for this pick.
 The Toronto Maple Leafs' sixth-round pick went to the Pittsburgh Penguins as a result of a March 3, 2010, trade that sent Chris Peluso to the Maple Leafs in exchange for this pick.
 The Pittsburgh Penguins' seventh-round pick went to the San Jose Sharks as the result of a June 26, 2010, trade that sent 2011 seventh-round pick to the Penguins in exchange for this pick.

References

External links
2010–11 Pittsburgh Penguins season at ESPN
2010–11 Pittsburgh Penguins season at Hockey Reference

Pittsburgh Penguins seasons
Pittsburgh Penguins season, 2010-11
P
Pitts
Pitts